Amadu Ali is a Ghanaian politician and also a teacher. He served as a member of parliament for the Atebubu South constituency in the Brong Ahafo Region in the second and third Parliament of the 4th republic of Ghana.

Early life and education 
Ali was born on 31 July 1953. He attended the Tamale Business Secondary School, where he obtained his West African Examination Certificate and after completed at the University of Cape Coast.

Politics 
Ali was first elected into parliament during the 1992 Ghanaian parliamentary election as the member of the first parliament of the fourth republic of Ghana on the ticket of the National Democratic Congress. Ali became member of the 2nd Parliament of the 4th Republic of Ghana when he was elected into office in the 1996 Ghanaian general elections. The term ended on 6 January 2001. He then contested for re-election during the 2000 Ghanaian general election. He won the seat with a majority of 3,645 votes. He was member of parliament for the Atebubu South constituency on the ticket of the National Democratic Congress from 7 January 1993 until he lost the seat during the 2004 Ghanaian general election to Emmanuel Owusu Manu when the constituency was merged to form the Atebubu-Amantin constituency.

Elections 
During the 2004 Ghanaian general election, Ali won the seat after polling 10,245 votes which was 52.70% of the total votes cast (19,430). Mumuni Ibrahim Mohammed on the ticket of the National Patriotic Party polled 6,600 votes which represents 34.00%. Another opponent of the National Reform Party (NRP) George Kwasi Nyarko polled 1,794 (9.20%). The rest of the votes were shared between Anthony Kwame Amevor of the People's National Convention (PNC) and Annor Z. Nikitins of the Convention People's Party (CPP). They polled 524 votes (2.70%) and 267 votes (1.40%) respectively.

Personal life 
Ali is a Muslim.

References 

University of Cape Coast alumni
National Democratic Congress (Ghana) politicians
Living people
1953 births
21st-century Ghanaian politicians
Ghanaian Muslims
People from Ashanti Region
Ghanaian MPs 1993–1997
Ghanaian MPs 1997–2001
Ghanaian MPs 2001–2005
People from Brong-Ahafo Region